Wolflight is the 23rd studio album by musician Steve Hackett. The album debuted at no. 31 in the UK album chart.

Track listing

CD edition 
All tracks by Steve Hackett except where noted.

"Out of the Body"
"Wolflight" (Steve Hackett, Jo Hackett)
"Love Song to a Vampire"
"The Wheel's Turning" (Steve Hackett, Jo Hackett, Roger King)
"Corycian Fire" (Steve Hackett, Jo Hackett, Roger King)
"Earthshine"
"Loving Sea" (Steve Hackett, Jo Hackett)
"Black Thunder" (Steve Hackett, Jo Hackett)
"Dust and Dreams" (Steve Hackett, Roger King)
"Heart Song"

Vinyl edition 
The vinyl edition also included a 12-track CD of the album ("Pneuma", "Midnight Sun" and "Caress" are absent from the CD version).

All tracks by Steve Hackett except where noted:

Side 1
"Out of the Body"
"Wolflight" (Steve Hackett, Jo Hackett)
"Love Song to a Vampire"
Side 2
"The Wheel's Turning" (Steve Hackett, Jo Hackett, Roger King)
"Corycian Fire" (Steve Hackett, Jo Hackett, Roger King)
"Earthshine"
"Loving Sea" (Steve Hackett, Jo Hackett)
Side 3
"Black Thunder" (Steve Hackett, Jo Hackett)
"Dust and Dreams" (Steve Hackett, Roger King)
"Heart Song"
Side 4
"Pneuma"
"Midnight Sun"
"Caress"

CD/Blu-ray edition 
This edition of the album contains a Blu-ray disk with a 5.1 surround sound version of the album. "Caress" is missing from both the CD and Blu-ray on this edition.
All tracks by Steve Hackett except where noted.

"Out of the Body"
"Wolflight" (Steve Hackett, Jo Hackett)
"Love Song to a Vampire"
"The Wheel's Turning" (Steve Hackett, Jo Hackett/Roger King)
"Corycian Fire" (Steve Hackett, Jo Hackett, Roger King)
"Earthshine"
"Loving Sea" (Steve Hackett, Jo Hackett)
"Black Thunder" (Steve Hackett, Jo Hackett)
"Dust and Dreams" (Steve Hackett, Roger King)
"Heart Song"
"Pneuma"
"Midnight Sun"

Personnel
Steve Hackett - electric and acoustic guitars (all tracks), banjo (8), oud (5, 9), tiple (7), harmonica (4, 8), percussion (1, 4, 7), lead, harmony and backing vocals (2-5, 7, 8, 10)
Roger King - keyboards (all tracks), programming (all tracks)
Nick Beggs - bass (all tracks except 3), Chapman Stick (8)
Chris Squire - bass (3)
Gary O'Toole - drums (1-5, 8)
Hugo Degenhardt - drums (9, 10)
Rob Townsend - saxophone (4, 8), duduk (5)
Christine Townsend - violin (1-4, 8), viola (1-4, 8)
Amanda Lehmann - vocals (2-4, 8)
Jo Hackett - vocals (4)
Malik Mansurov - tar (2)
Sara Kovács - didgeridoo (2)
Technical
 Produced by Hackett/King
 Recorded, mixed and mastered by King
 Mansurov & Kovács recorded by Tamas Barabas
 Design by Harry Pearce
 Photographic artwork by Maurizio and Angéla Vicedomini

Reception
Despite enjoying only moderate chart success internationally, the album was highly rated by www.ultimateclassicrock.com, which included Wolflight in its shortlist of the Best Classic Albums of 2015 (so far), on 4 July 2015.

It said Hackett had used a variety of musical genres and added: "He boldly breaks free of the historical constrictions surrounding the Genesis Revisited projects, even as he recalls the striking instrumental turns that defined his early legacy."

References

2015 albums
Steve Hackett albums
Century Media Records albums